This is a list of railway stations in Tyne and Wear, with estimated usage figures gathered from data collected by the Office of Rail and Road (ORR). As of May 2020, there are seven National Rail stations located within the county of Tyne and Wear, from which around 9.73 million passenger journeys were made during 2018–19. There are also 60 Tyne and Wear Metro stations in the county, with around 36.4 million journeys made across the network during 2018–19.

Gallery

References

See also 

 List of busiest railway stations in Great Britain
List of Tyne and Wear Metro stations

Busiest railway stations in Tyne and Wear